James Harold Tarbotton, a.k.a. Tarbolton (5 May 1899 – 4 April 1997) was an Australian rules footballer who played with Fitzroy in the Victorian Football League (VFL).

Family
The son of James Thorpe Tarbotton (1856-1942), and Mary Stuart Tarbotton (1857-1946), née MacLaurin, James Harold Tarbotton was born at Bradford, England on 5 May 1899.

He married Nita Agnes Banks (1901-1946) in 1923.

World War I
Tarbotton, then living in Sydney, enlisted to serve in the Australian Army in July 1916, falsifying his mother’s signature on his enlistment papers and lying about his age. When his mother discovered his deception, she wrote to the War Office and he was discharged in December 1916. In March 1917 Tarbotton re-enlisted the 1st AIF and served in the Middle East during the later stages of the war.

Football
Tarbotton came to Fitzroy from the Railways club in Sydney. He was on a half back flank for Fitzroy in the 1923 VFL Grand Final, which they lost to Essendon.

World War II
Tarbotton later served in the Australian Army during World War II.

Notes

References
 
 
 Four Different Birth Dates for this Player, NSW Australian Football History Society, 16 February 2015.
 Tarbotton Farewelled: To Play in Melbourne, The (Sydney) Daily Telegraph, (Monday, 17 July 1922), p.8.
 Gossip of the Clubs: Sydney Player with Fitzroy, The Herald, (Friday, 18 August 1922), p.4.
 Fitzroy Jubilant, The Sporting Globe, (Saturday, 28 April 1923), p.5.

External links
 James Harold Tarbolton, profile at NSW Australian Football History Society, 21 September 2019.
 
 
 Jim Tarbolton (sic) at Boyles Football Photos.

1899 births
1997 deaths
VFL/AFL players born in England
Australian military personnel of World War I
Australian Army personnel of World War II
Australian rules footballers from Sydney
Fitzroy Football Club players
English emigrants to Australia
Sportspeople from Bradford
Military personnel from New South Wales